The 2023 season will be the Dallas Cowboys' upcoming 64th season in the National Football League and their fourth under head coach Mike McCarthy. The Cowboys will attempt to improve upon their 12-5 record from the previous two seasons and win the NFC East for the first time since 2021.

This will be the first season since 2015 that running back Ezekiel Elliott will not be on the roster, as he was released on March 15, 2023.

Offseason

Signings

Re-signings

Trade acquisitions

Departures

Draft

Staff

Current roster

Preseason
The Cowboys' preseason opponents and schedule will be announced in the spring.

Regular season

2023 opponents
Listed below are the Cowboys' opponents for 2023. Exact dates and times will be announced in the spring.

References

External links
 

Dallas
Dallas Cowboys seasons
Dallas Cowboys